A lyre is a stringed musical instrument.

Lyre(s) may also refer to:

Lyre (vine system), a vine training system
Lyre, County Cork, Ireland, a village
Lyre (horse), a Thoroughbred racehorse
Lyre River, in Washington U.S.
lyre snake, common name of the snake genus Trimorphodon
Lyres (band), an American alternative rock band
Lyra, a constellation
A music stand attached to an instrument

See also
Liar (disambiguation)
Lire (disambiguation)
Lyrebird, two species of ground-dwelling Australian birds
The Lyre of Orpheus (disambiguation)
Lyre arm, a wooden lyre-shaped element often used at the front of the arm of a chair
Lyra (disambiguation)